Antokolsky (spelling variations: Antokolskiy, Antokolski)  is a Russian surname. It derives from the Polish form Antokol of the toponym Antakalnis, a neighborhood of Vilnius, Lithuania. The notable bearers of this surname were:
Mark Antokolski (1843–1902), Russian sculptor
Pavel Antokolsky (1896–1978), Russian poet

Polish toponymic surnames